The United East men's basketball tournament is the annual conference basketball championship tournament for the NCAA Division III United East Conference. The tournament has been held annually since the conference was founded in 2005 as the North Eastern Athletic Conference. In 2021 the title was changed to United East for the 2021-22 season. It is a single-elimination tournament and seeding is based on regular season records.

The winner, declared conference champion, receives the United East's automatic bid to the NCAA Men's Division III Basketball Championship.

Results

North Eastern Athletic Conference

United East Conference

Championship records

 Gallaudet, Penn College, Penn State Berks, and St. Mary's (MD) have not yet qualified for the NEAC or United East tournament finals
 Bard, Bryn Athyn, Cairn (Philadelphia Biblical), D'Youville, Keuka, NYU Poly, Saint Elizabeth, SUNY Purchase, and Wilson never qualified for the tournament finals as NEAC members

References

NCAA Division III men's basketball conference tournaments
Basketball Tournament, Men's
Recurring sporting events established in 2005